Nottingham Airport , also known as Nottingham City Airport, is located in Tollerton, Nottinghamshire, England. The aerodrome is equipped for private aviation, business aviation and flight instruction.

The longer runway is equipped with lighting for night flying, which operates during the winter flying season.

Nottingham City Aerodrome has a CAA Ordinary Licence (Number P491) that allows flights for the public transport of passengers or for flying instruction as authorised by the licensee (Truman Aviation Limited).

History 
Nottingham (Tollerton) Airport was opened in 1930 for civilian aviation. During the Second World War, the airport was known as RAF Tollerton and acted as a relief landing ground for the Polish Training School based at RAF Newton for the Polish Air Force, and was host to Field Aircraft Services, which repaired battle damaged heavy aircraft and later dismantled them.

After the war the airfield returned to civilian use including a short lived period as a commercial airport, with Blue Line Airways operating from there until 1949, when its aircraft passed on to British Eagle Since that time, Tollerton has serviced small private aircraft only, this has included hosting airshows and three King's Cup Air Races 1967, 1968, and 1970.

The  airport was purchased in December 2006 from Nottingham City Council, by a consortium called Nottingham City Airport plc., and a programme of improvement was promised.

Truman Aviation
Truman Aviation is the airport operator. It is responsible for providing air/ground services, fire and rescue services and handling on the aerodrome.

Sherwood Flying Club
Sherwood Flying Club is a members-only flying club, based at Nottingham Airport. It was founded in 1957 and presently uses one Piper PA-28 Archer, two Piper PA-28 Warriors and a single Grob G-115 for hire and training.

2425 (Nottingham Airport Squadron) Air Training Corps
2425 Squadron has been based at the airport since the early 1980s. This thriving squadron is one of around 1,000 squadrons that form the Air Training Corps or RAF Air Cadets. Cadets are from Tollerton and the surrounding suburbs and villages within an approximately 10-mile radius.

References

Sources and further reading

 Howard Fisher, Bob Hammond and Nigel Morley (2008) Tollerton – An Airfield For Nottingham 1929–2007 (Keyworth and District Local History Society, Keyworth, Nottingham)

External links

 Tollerton airfield during WW2
 Nottingham City Airport (official site)
 Sherwood Flying Club – official site
 2425 Squadron RAF Air Cadets
 

Airports in England
Transport in Nottinghamshire
Nottingham
Transport in Nottingham
Airports in the East Midlands